Siberian regionalism is a political movement that advocates for the formation of an autonomous Siberian state. The idea originated in the mid-19th century and reached a high tide with the White movement military activities of Aleksandr Kolchak (1874–1920) and Viktor Pepelyayev (1885–1920) during the Russian Civil War of 1917–1922.

Foundations

Regionalism and autonomy 
Siberian regionalism, according to Susan Smith-Peter, is the first political regionalist movement in a European country. Following the activities of Afanasy Shchapov (1830–1876) in Siberia, a movement advocating a far-ranging autonomy for the region took shape under the name of "regionalism" (oblastnichestvo). In the 19th century Siberian students in Saint Petersburg:  Grigory Potanin (1835–1920), Nikolay Yadrintsev (1842–1894) and people with other backgrounds founded the movement.

Independence 
Some radical members in 1863 presumably prepared a revolt in Siberia together with exiled Poles and Ukrainians, trying to achieve independence and to begin the development of a Siberian state, similar to the United States.  Tsarist authorities arrested and imprisoned forty-four members of the group in May 1865, after watch-officers of the Siberian Cadet Corps searched cadet Arseny Samsonov, aged 16, for illicit items and found a proclamation entitled "To Patriots of Siberia", attributed to a collective authorship of Grigory Potanin, Nikolay Yadrintsev,  (1841–1882), et al.

The Russian revolutionary Mikhail Bakunin (1814–1876) supported the idea of an autonomous Siberia in the hope  it would become a democratic state, prosperous within a union with United States and leading to the collapse of Imperial Russia. Local thinkers and settlers saw Siberia as means of escape from the oppression of the Russian Empire, and as the seed of a possible free and democratic country that would spread freedom across Asia.

In the end of the 19th and at beginning of the 20th century, Siberian regionalists led by Potanin and Yadrintsev formed a legal opposition to Russian colonialism in Siberia; they wrote many books and articles, and organized research into Siberian cultures, economics, ethnicities, races, etc. Yadrintsev's greatest book, Siberia as a colony (Сибирь как колония), envisaged the future of Siberia as domination of the white race and a European way of development, similar to the U.S., claiming that the Siberians already had many differences from their Russian and East-Slavic ancestors — especially cultural differences such as love of freedom and private initiative.

Provisional Government of Autonomous Siberia
 
After the February Revolution, the development of oblastnichestvo gained momentum, as on May 21, 1917, when the Oblastniks convened their first general meeting in Irkutsk, where they heard and discussed the report delivered by I.I. Serebrennikov "On the autonomy of Siberia". In August, the Oblastniks convened the Conference of Public Organizations based on the decision of Tomsk Provincial People's Assembly as of May 18, 1917. On August 5, 1917, the Conference approved "The Regulations for the Autonomy of Siberia" and heard the report by P.A. Kazantsev "On the Siberian National Banner", which it also unanimously approved:  
The National Siberian Banner shall be a combination of two colours: white and green. White colour means Siberian snow, whilst green colour – Siberian taiga. The banner shall be rectangular, split into two parts diagonally from the left top to right bottom. thus, the upper triangle shall be of green colour, and the lower one – of white colour.The flags of the national entities in Russia in 1917–1920 On January 28, 1918, the Siberian Regional Duma was convened in Tomsk in secret, fearing suppression by the Bolsheviks, who occupied the city. The members elected the members of the Provisional Government of Autonomous Siberia from four political factions:

 The Socialist-Revolutionary Party delegated: 
 P.Ya. Derber to be the Chairman of the Government, 
 Colonel A.A. Krakovetsky to take the Ministry of Defence, 
 A.Ye. Novosyolov – Minister of Internal Affairs, 
 N.Ye. Zhernakov – State Controller, 
 Ye.V. Zakharov, S.A. Kudryavtsev and M.B. Shatilov to be ministers with no charge. 
 The Oblastniks delegated: 
 P.V. Vologodsky to become the Minister of Foreign Affairs, 
 V.M. Krutovsky – Minister of Public Health, 
 G.B. Patushinsky – Minister of Justice, 
 I.I. Serebrennikov – Minister of Supply and Food, 
 I.A. Mikhailov – Minister of Finance, 
 L.A. Ustrugov – Minister of Railways. 
 The ethnic minorities delegated:
 V.T. Tiber-Petrov to take the position of the Minister of Native Affairs, 
 D.G. Sulima – Minister of Exterritorial Peoples, 
 E.D. Rinchino – Minister of Public Education, 
 G.S. Neometullov to be a minister with no charge. 
 Mensheviks delegated: 
 M.A. Kolobov to become the Minister of Trade and Industry
 I.S. Yudin to become the Minister of Labour. 

Only a handful of them agreed to take part in the Government. Fairly soon, most of the ministers had to flee to the Far East and stayed there until July, when they went to Vladivostok after it was liberated from the Bolsheviks by the Czechs.

Meanwhile, on May 27, 1918, Colonel A.N. Grishin-Almazov, who undertook his best efforts to unite the officer resistance against the Bolsheviks, ordered a full scale uprising, which proved to be a total success, as the Whites managed to defeat the Reds and cleared many Siberian cities of their presence. On June 13, 1918, colonel A.N. Grishin-Almazov issued an order to form the West Siberian Army (later to become Siberian Army). In a matter of months, he managed to accumulate over 10,000 volunteers across Siberia and Urals, which allowed some of the Siberian ministers headed by P.V. Vologodsky to come back.

Provisional Siberian Government 
On June 23, 1918, Vologodsky formed a new Provisional Siberian Government instead of the previously elected Government of Autonomous Siberia, which had virtually no influence and authority whatsoever. He took the chair and ministry of foreign affairs assisted by many of his former member ministers I.I. Serebrennikov, who again became the Minister of Supply, while I.A. Mikhailov was chosen to be the Minister of Finance and M.B. Shatilov – the Minister of Native Affairs. Colonel A.N. Grishin-Almazov was appointed Minister of Defence.

Under the control of the regionalists, there was a short-term state formation, so-called "Siberian Republic". On July 11, 1918, the Provisional Siberian Government published the Declaration, declaring its authority over territory of Siberia, and restoration of the Russian state as the ultimate goal of the Siberian government. Decision on the status of Siberia was left to the future All-Russian and Siberian constituent assemblies.

On November 3, 1918, the Provisional Siberian Government sacrificed own independence for the sake of consolidation of all possible forces to fight against the Bolsheviks. Thereby it merged with the Ufa Directory, forming Provisional All-Russian Government.

Modern movements 
In 2014, an artist, Artyom Loskutov, wrote in his blog about an idea to create a Siberian Republic within the Russian Federation and attempted to organize a mock demonstration called Monstration for Siberian federalisation to take place on August 17 in Novosibirsk. Russian authorities banned the march and attempted to censor media coverage about the event, citing a recently passed law against "calls to mass unrest, extremist activities or participation in illegal public events." The purpose of the protest was to "ridicule the Kremlin's claimed hypocrisy in the annexation of Crimea by the Russian Federation and to raise the issue of Siberia's delayed development". He claimed that Western Siberia provides most of Russia's oil and gas, but the region gets very little benefit since the taxes go to Moscow.

See also

 Autonomous administrative divisions of Russia
 List of active separatist movements in Asia
 Secession in Russia

References

Bibliography 
 Anisimova, Alla; Echevskaia, Olga (2016). "Reading Post-Soviet (Trans)formations of Siberian Identity through Biographical Narrative," REGION: Regional Studies of Russia, Eastern Europe, and Central Asia 5, no. 2. pp. 127–148.
 
 Balzer, M. M. (1999). The Tenacity of Ethnicity: A Siberian Saga in Global Perspective. Princeton University Press
 Curtis, K. (1985). The Soviet State: The Domestic Roots of Soviet Foreign Policy. Royal Institute of International Affairs.
 von Hagen, Mark (2007). "Federalisms and Pan-movements: Re-imagining Empire," in Russian Empire: Space, People, Power, ed. Jane Burbank, Mark von Hagen and Anatoli Remnev. Indiana University Press, 494–510.
 Hanson, Gary (1974) "Siberian Regionalism in the 1860s," Topic 27: 62–75.
 Kovalaschina, Elena (2007). "The Historical and Cultural Ideals of the Siberian Oblastnichestvo," Sibirica 6, no. 2: 87–119.
 von Mohrenschildt, Dimitri (1981). Toward a United States of Russia: Plans and Projects of Federal Reconstruction of Russia in the Nineteenth Century. Fairleigh Dickinson University Press. 
 
 
 Tishkov, Valery (1997). Ethnicity, Nationalism and Conflict in and after the Soviet Union: The Mind Aflame. Sage Publications Ltd.

External links 
 The A.S. Pushkin Tomsk Regional Universal Scientific Library: Siberian Oblastnichestvo. Chronicle
 The flags of the national entities in Russia in 1917–1920
 V.V. Zhuravlev (2000) The National Symbols of the "White" Russia
 Siberian regionalism: a growing threat to Moscow at Jamestown.org
History of Siberia
Separatism in Russia
Post–Russian Empire states
Siberian nationalism